Private Joe Walker is a fictional black market spiv (or Wholesales Supplier, as he politely puts it) and Home Guard platoon member, first portrayed by actor James Beck in the BBC television sitcom Dad's Army. In real life, Beck died suddenly on 6 August 1973. The character of Walker was one of the seven primary characters in the show. Following his character's departure (Walker was last mentioned in the episode "The Recruit", although he does not appear in this episode) the series attempted to replace him with a war reporter called Private Cheeseman (played by Talfryn Thomas), who had made a previous cameo appearance in the episode "My British Buddy".

Personality
Walker is the second-youngest member of the platoon, the youngest being Private Pike, and speaks with a cockney accent. A pleasant and amiable (if slightly shifty) personality, Walker is nevertheless a constant thorn in Captain Mainwaring's side, for he doesn't share Mainwaring's idealism, and makes cheeky and witty interruptions during his serious lectures. However, despite this he is good-natured and loyal to his commanding officer and platoon comrades, and is a valuable asset to the platoon, owing to his many "business" connections and his ability to mysteriously conjure up almost anything that, due to the War, is rationed or no longer in the shops—and he will also have it in vast supply (for a price).

Walker also demonstrates keen improvisational skills and cunning; as a result, owing to these attributes and his cheerful willingness to use tactics that Mainwaring might not consider to be 'cricket', he is usually responsible for getting the platoon out of many of the scrapes that they find themselves in. He is constantly on the lookout for opportunities to make a few bob, and can normally be found trying to sell such things as petrol coupons and black market foodstuffs to his platoon comrades, usually at high prices and from dubious sources. His "business" activities are not limited to just the members of the platoon, or indeed even to the residents of Walmington-on-Sea, as he has often made reference to acquiring "essential supplies" for members of the rival Eastgate platoon and various influential people, military or civilian; at one point, he offers to provide "a couple of bottles of scotch" to a high-ranking GHQ officer, when Mainwaring briefly loses his command of the platoon. Indeed, the only time Walker can't find a buyer for his "essential supplies" is when the American Army arrives at Walmington-on-Sea (with the comparatively well-off American troops already having plenty of liquor and other items normally provided by Walker).

Walker considers himself a ladies' man; an early episode showed Walker entering an unknown woman's house at night and departing the next morning. In the episode "War Dance", he brings twin sisters as his dates to a dance Mainwaring is hosting. Walker also has a recurring girlfriend named Shirley/Edith (played by Wendy Richard), who is seen in several episodes.

In the platoon, he mostly associates with Lance Corporal Jones, Pike and Frazer. Despite merely being a private, Walker clearly has some form of influence over the platoon, not least due to his black-market dealings which have got them out of (and into) numerous scrapes. Moreover, when Private Frazer is temporarily promoted to captain in "If the Cap Fits...", he selects Walker as his sergeant. Walker has friendly relationships with all the men in the platoon, jokingly referring to the Scottish Frazer as "Taffy", and occasionally calling Jones a "silly old duffer" when they have the odd disagreement. While often exasperating Mainwaring with his constant quips and irreverent attitude towards the war in general and the platoon in particular, on one occasion (in the episode "Sons of the Sea") Mainwaring praises Walker's "lively sense of cockney humour" and for keeping his cool under stress (to which a surprised Walker stammers that he was "only trying to keep people cheerful"). At times, Walker even expresses a sentimental sense of fondness for Mainwaring and others in the platoon, telling Frazer (in the episode "Absent Friends") that he was bothered by seeing Mainwaring upset after the platoon chose to stay in the pub playing darts instead of going on parade. In the same episode, he tells Frazer to leave Godfrey alone when the latter decides to go back on parade instead of staying in the pub with the others; he expresses similar sentiments in the episode "Branded" when Godfrey is set to be kicked out of the platoon due to his being a conscientious objector during the First World War, referring to Godfrey as a "nice old bloke". Walker even dwells on the concept of Jones potentially leaving a fellow soldier to die in the episode "The Two and a Half Feathers", to the point that it interrupts his makeout session with his girlfriend.

In Battle of the Giants!, Walker recounts a story of being awarded a medal of the Sacred Order of the Golden Kris of Abu Dhabi by a Sheikh staying in a hotel on Park Lane, London who was very grateful for Walker's efforts fixing him "up with a bird".

He is supposedly allergic to corned beef, and this is given as the reason why he has not been called up for the regular army, although it is generally assumed that he has found a way to dodge the rules. This allergy was exposed in the episode The Loneliness of the Long Distance Walker, which has since been lost from the BBC's archives. He was conscripted, only to be discharged when it was found that corned beef fritters were the only rations left for the soldiers to eat.

Walker's final appearance was in the episode Things That Go Bump in the Night, where the platoon spent the night in a mysterious house. In fact he is only seen in the location shots, filmed some time before the studio recording. Beck was ill for the recordings of both this episode and the next episode, The Recruit, in which Walker had "gone up to the smoke" (a slang term for London) to "do a deal". After Beck's death, Walker was never mentioned in the show again (though the character survived the war; the very first episode begins with a scene set in 1968, as Mainwaring—now an alderman—launches his "I'm Backing Britain" campaign, and Walker is seen as one of the town worthies present at the launch).
 
In the radio adaptations of the series, Graham Stark stood in until Larry Martyn gave his portrayal of Walker for subsequent shows. John Bardon played Walker in the stage production in 1976. Scriptwriter Jimmy Perry originally intended to play the part himself, but was advised against it by his co-writer David Croft. Walker was based on a spiv character created and performed by British comedian and actor Arthur English (English was in the controversial episode "Absent Friends", and starred in Are You Being Served?).

Dad's Army characters
Fictional spivs
Television characters introduced in 1968